The men's 100 metres at the 2013 Asian Athletics Championships was held at the Shree Shiv Chhatrapati Sports Complex on 3 and 4 July.

Medalists

Records

Schedule

Results

Heats
First 3 in each heat (Q) and 4 best performers (q) advanced to the Semifinals.

Wind: Heat 1: -0.2 m/s, Heat 2: +0.1 m/s, Heat 3: -0.3 m/s, Heat 4: +0.1 m/s

Semi-finals
First 3 in each heat (Q) and 2 best performers (q) advanced to the final.
Wind: Heat 1: -1.1 m/s, Heat 2: -0.5 m/s

Final

Wind: -0.3 m/s

References
Official results

100 Men's
100 metres at the Asian Athletics Championships